Genaro Carreño Muro (born 27 September 1958) is a Mexican politician affiliated with the PAN. He currently serves as Deputy of the LXII Legislature of the Mexican Congress representing Guanajuato.

References

1958 births
Living people
Politicians from Guanajuato
National Action Party (Mexico) politicians
People from Salamanca, Guanajuato
21st-century Mexican politicians
Deputies of the LXII Legislature of Mexico
Members of the Chamber of Deputies (Mexico) for Guanajuato